Sri Sumangala College - Moratu Maha Vidyalaya Cricket Encounter (Battle of the Golds) is an annual cricket match played between Sri Sumangala College and Moratu Maha Vidyalaya since 1934. It is known as The Battle of the Golds due to the colours of the two schools' flags i.e. Green, Gold and Blue of Sri Sumangala College and Maroon, Gold & Maroon of Moratu Maha Vidyalaya.

History 
The first encounter between the two schools dates back to 1934. The first match in the sequence was played in 1934 under the captain, W. Lionel Fernando of Sri Sumangala College and H. N. Samarasinghe of Moratu Maha Vidyalaya. The first victory for Sumangalians was in 1962 under the Captaincy of P. P. Silva while the first victory for Moraliyans was in 1956 under the Captaincy of T. Hapugoda. Of the 68 big matches played between the two schools until 2019, Sumangalians has won 08 and Moraliyans 07, with the rest being declared draw.

Among the many successes of Sri Sumangala College, Iresh Pushpakumara’s 08 wickets in an inning in 2007 big match is the best bowling figure so far in the history and Roshan Wimalasena’s 153 in 1996 in the highest score in the history. In 1981 big match Ravin Wickramaratne set another record by scoring an unbeaten 104 runs and taking 5 wickets with a hat trick. Interestingly, Wickramarathna has also been elected as the Vice President of Sri Lanka Cricket in the recent past, from his previous tenure as Assistant Secretary. A few other victories for Sumangalians include 1975 Captain Tissa Eleperuma representing Ceylon Team before the test status was granted, 1983 Captain Don Anurasiri being the first Sumangalian to present Sri Lanka's test cricket team, who was subsequently followed by 1995 Captain Indika Gallage and 2001 Captain Dilruwan Perera.

A few other remarkable cricketers in the local playing field who began their cricketing career at Sri Sumangala include, Kaushal Silva before playing for St Thomas's College; Kithuruwan Vithanage before joining Royal College, Colombo and U13 and U15 Captain Oshada Fernando before joining St Sebastian’s College, Moratuwa. While Kithruwan Vithanage earned his spot in the Sri Lanka team from 2013-2016, Kaushal Silva and Oshada Fernando are still a part of the Sri Lankan team.

A noteworthy player in Sri Lanka Cricket, Ajantha Mendis, is an old boy of Moratu Maha Vidyalaya.

The one day encounters, which began 28 years ago in 1993, have resulted in 13 victories for Sumangalians, 11 for Moraliyans, 02 matches where no decision was taken and a match not played in 2001.

Past Results

Big Matches 

Results of the Big Matches
Matches Played - 70
Matches Drawn - 55
Matches Won by Sri Sumangala College - 08
Matches Won by Moratu Maha Vidyalaya - 07

Records 

Sri Sumangala College:
Highest Score: 153 by Roshan Wimalasena in 1996
Best Bowling: 8 wickets by Iresh Pushpakumara in 2007 
Highest Total: 354/7 in 2007
Lowest Total: 42 in 1979 
 
Moratu Maha Vidyalaya:
Highest Score: 129 by Ranjith Fernando in 1979
Best Bowling: 8 for 53 by Manjula Peiris in 1980
Highest Total: 357/9 in 1956
Lowest Total: 36 in 1973

Result Table

Limited Over matches 

Results of the Limited Over matches
Matches Played - 29
Matches Won by Sri Sumangala College - 15
Matches Won by Moratu Maha Vidyalaya - 11
Matches with No Decision - 02
Matches Not Played - 01

Records 

Sri Sumangala College
Highest Total: 272 in 2017 
Lowest Total: 102/3 in 2006 
 
Moratu Maha Vidyalaya:
Highest Total: 240/8 in 2009 
Lowest Total: 62 in 2007

Result Table

Captains of Series

Batting and Bowling Records

Sri Sumangala College Team 
Batting and Bowling Records by Sri Sumangala College team's Players in big matches.

Batting

Centuries

Bowling

Best bowling in an Innings

Moratu Maha Vidyalaya Team 
Batting and Bowling Records by Moratu Maha Vidyalaya team's Players in big matches.

Batting

Centuries

Bowling

Best bowling in an Innings

Family Members Who Played In The Series

Brothers In The Series

Sri Sumangala College 
Brothers who played for the Sri Sumangala College

A. K. D. SamankumaraA. K. D. Kalum Sanjeewa

Asitha Rathnaweera 
Kalum Rathnaweera 
1993/1994

Fathers & Sons In The Series

Sri Sumangala College 
Fathers & Sons who played for the Sri Sumangala College

A. K. D. SamankumaraJanidu Inuwara

Venues 
De Soysa Stadium, Moratuwa (formerly known as Tyronne Fernando Stadium)
Panadura Esplanade (Home ground of the Panadura Sports Club)

Noted 
 Students of Sri Sumangala College are known as Sumangalians
 Students of Moratu Maha Vidyalaya are known as Moraliyans

References

External links
 67th Battle of the Golds Photo Coverage
 27th Limited Overs Encounter: Full match
 27th Limited Overs Encounter: Highlights
 26th Limited Overs Encounter: Full match
 Official Battle of the Golds Facebook Page
 Sri Sumangala College Official Website
 Moratu Maha Vidyalaya Official Website
 Official Website of the Old Boys' Association of Sri Sumangala College
 Official Facebook Page of the Past Cricketers' Association of Sri Sumangala College

Big Matches
Sri Lankan cricket in the 20th century
Sri Lankan cricket in the 21st century